Vanderstuyft,  Van der Stuyft, Vander Stuyft is a surname. Notable people with the surname include:

Arthur Vanderstuyft (1883–1956), Belgian cyclist
Fritz Vanderstuyft (1854–1922), Belgian cyclist, father of Arthur and Léon
Léon Vanderstuyft (1890–1964), Belgian cyclist